The Graphic Arts Institute of Oaxaca is a school of art located in the city of Oaxaca de Juarez, Oaxaca, Mexico. The institute was founded by artist Francisco Toledo and hosts a large collection of artwork from Latin America.

Cultural center
The Institute also serves as a cultural center that includes:

 The Library of Institute of Graphic Arts of Oaxaca specializing in art, which houses about 60,000 volumes mainly donated by Francisco Toledo
 The Centro Fotográfico Álvarez Bravo, named after the Mexican photographer Manuel Alvarez Bravo (1902–2002)
 The Eduardo Mata Music Library

References

External links
 IAGO website, Blogspot
 Library of IAGO, Google Groups

Contemporary art galleries in Mexico
Modern art museums
Art schools in Mexico
Spanish Colonial architecture in Mexico
Museums in Oaxaca
Art museums established in 1988
1988 establishments in Mexico
Education in Oaxaca